Edgar Boutry (1857–1938) was a French sculptor who executed several public statues and monuments and worked on several Monuments aux Morts. He also ran the Écoles académiques lilloises.

Early years and studies

Boutry was born in Lille and died at Levallois-Perret. He was a pupil of Albert Darcq at the Écoles académiques lilloises and then of Jules Cavelier at the École des Beaux-Arts in Paris.  He was runner up for the "Prix de Rome" in 1885 and won the prize in 1887. He was eventually to succeed Albert Darcq at the Écoles académiques lilloises. During his lifetime he was responsible for a number of public statues in Lille and in other parts of Northern France. His work also decorates several town halls, as well as an hotel and several churches.

Monument aux morts and other works related to the Great War 1914-1918

Other works. Church Furnishing and architectural embellishments

Other works of art

 In the Palais des Beaux-Arts in Lille, there is an aquarelle painting of a violinist by Boutry which he executed in 1929.
The work "Thésée rendant à Oedipe ses deux filles, Antigone et Ismène" was Boutry's submission for the "Prix de Rome de Sculpture" in 1887. It is now held by the Beaux-arts de Paris, l'école nationale supérieure.
 Boutry's submission for the Prix de Rome in 1888 was the copy of a work in the Musée du Louvre of a seated philosopher. It is a Ronde-Bosse in marble and plaster and is held by the Beaux-arts de Paris, l'école nationale supérieure.
 In the Lille Palais des Beaux-Arts there is a relief in bronze by Boutry which depicts A.Mourcou. It was executed in 1910.
 Boutry executed the bronze statue of Jeanne Maillotte which is located on the Avenue du Peuple Belge. Maillotte was an inn-keeper who became involved in the religious conflicts at the time between Catholics and Protestants. These conflicts often became physical and July 1582 saw the rebelling Protestants ("Les hurlus") attacking Lille. Jeanne urged her fellow citizens to repulse the hurlus, leading by example and the action was a success. Maillotte became something of a legend and is remembered by Boutry's statue, inaugurated 27 May 1935 and in local songs in particular that of Alexandre Desrousseaux who wrote the famous ballade "P'tit Quinquin".
 Boutry executed a marble bust of Eugène Guillaume who was a director of the École des Beaux-Arts in Lille. This work is now held in the Beaux-arts de Paris, l'école nationale supérieure.
 Boutry executed two large decorated vases that are situated besides the Promenade Chamars et Fort Chaudanne in Besançon.
 In the Levallois-Perret Cemetery near Paris, located in the place du 11 Novembre 1918, Boutry executed in 1920 a bronze relief portrait of Louis Mortier for the latter's tomb.  This cemetery is located north-west of Paris.
 Boutry executed a bronze médaillon depicting Emile Vandenbergh. This is now in the Palais des Beaux-Arts in Lille.
 "L'Amour et la Folie" is a bronze bas-relief by Boutry now held in the Palais des Beaux-Arts in Lille.
 Boutry executed the allegorical work "Peace" in the Grand Foyer of the Lille Opera House.

Works featuring depictions of Edgar-Henri Boutry

In the Musée d'Orsay in Paris there is a bronze relief of Boutry by Frédéric de Vernon.

Images of Boutry's work

See also
Hôtel Terminus

References

1857 births
1938 deaths
Prix de Rome for sculpture
20th-century French sculptors
20th-century French male artists
19th-century French sculptors
French male sculptors
19th-century French male artists